Ira Davis may refer to:

 Ira Davis (baseball) (1870–1942), infielder in Major League Baseball
 Ira Davis (athlete) (born 1936), American triple jumper